Brittany Borman (born July 1, 1989) is an American track and field athlete who competes primarily in the discus and the javelin throw.  She is a four-time NCAA Track and Field Champion, winning the javelin in 2010, 2011, and 2012, and the discus in 2010.  In 2012, she won the US Olympic Trials in the javelin and represented the United States at the 2012 Summer Olympics.  She also represented the US at the 2016 Olympic Games.

Early life
Brittany Borman was born July 1, 1989 in St. Louis, Missouri to Richard and Laura Borman.  She first became involved with track and field at age six, competing with her two sisters - Danielle and Breanne.  By the time she entered high school, Borman had tried nearly every track and field event.  At Festus High School, she competed in shot put, discus, long jump, 100 m hurdles, triple jump and high jump.  By the time she graduated in 2008, she was a four team All-Metro track star.  She won state championships in high jump (5 ft-4 in) as a sophomore and in both the discus (150 ft-5 in) and shot put (44 ft-10.25 in) as a junior.  In her senior year, she suffered a hamstring injury before the state finals, but still managed to win the discus (135 ft-9 in) and shot put (42 ft-8 in) titles.

In 2007, she won both the javelin (42.41m/139 ft-1in) and shot put (13.48m/44 ft-2.75in) at the AAU Junior Olympics.

Athletic career

After high school, Borman was accepted to UCLA on an athletic scholarship.  She planned to follow in the footsteps of her idol Jackie Joyner-Kersee and compete the heptathlon.  However, after one season she transferred to the University of Oklahoma and decided to concentrate on the discus and javelin exclusively.

Additionally, she has won four Big Twelve titles and is a four-time All-American. She holds the Oklahoma school record in both the javelin and discus.

Borman competed in the US National Championship in 2010 and 2011, finishing seventh in the javelin both years. She qualified for the 2012 Olympic Trials in the javelin. Entering the final round of competition, she was in third place with three spots in the 2012 Summer Olympics up for grabs. With the throw, she won the event and made the Olympic team. "I didn’t really know what happened differently [on the last throw]," Borman remarked. "I prayed before it and I am still in shock about how far I threw." She will be joined at the Olympics by Oklahoma teammate and close friend Tia Brooks, who placed third in the shot put.

At the 2012 Olympics, Borman's best throw during the qualifying round was 59.27 meters. She placed 8th in her group (15th overall) and did not qualify for the final.

Borman is coached by former Olympian, Todd Riech, and is sponsored by Nike.

2014 #2 ranked Javelin in the United States by Track and Field News.

Personal life
Borman credits a mission trip to Nicaragua for being the thing that has most shaped her life.  She currently lives in DeSoto, Missouri.

References

External links

1989 births
Living people
American female discus throwers
American female javelin throwers
Athletes (track and field) at the 2012 Summer Olympics
Athletes (track and field) at the 2016 Summer Olympics
Oklahoma Sooners women's track and field athletes
Olympic track and field athletes of the United States
Track and field athletes from St. Louis
Track and field athletes from Oklahoma
UCLA Bruins women's track and field athletes
World Athletics Championships athletes for the United States
People from De Soto, Missouri
USA Outdoor Track and Field Championships winners